It'll Shine When It Shines is the second album by the American country rock band The Ozark Mountain Daredevils, released in 1974.

Their debut album had been successful enough to give the band the clout to record their follow-up effort on the musicians' home turf. For the session, they cut their tracks in the pre-Civil War farmhouse that served as their rehearsal space, with producers Glyn Johns and David Anderle working from a mobile recording truck parked outside. The homey makeshift setup yielded a loose, organic vibe that invigorated material like Steve Cash's tongue-in-cheek swamp-rocker "E.E. Lawson".

This album contains the band's biggest single, "Jackie Blue", which reached number three on the Billboard Hot 100 in 1975. The song was brought in by Larry Lee late in the session and recorded at the insistence of Johns, who cajoled Lee into altering his original lyrics about a drug-dealing friend into a fond ode to a free-spirited female loner.

Track listing
"You Made It Right"  (John Dillon, Elizabeth Anderson) – 3:46
"Look Away"  (Randle Chowning) – 3:36
"Jackie Blue"  (Steve Cash, Larry Lee) – 4:11
"Kansas You Fooler"  (Larry Lee) – 2:39
"It Couldn't Be Better"  (John Dillon, Elizabeth Anderson) – 4:23
"E.E. Lawson"  (Steve Cash) – 3:32
"Walkin' Down the Road"  (John Dillon) – 3:28
"What's Happened Along My Life"  (Larry Lee) – 3:32
"It Probably Always Will"  (Michael Granda) – 3:15
"Lowlands"  (John Dillon) – 3:45
"Tidal Wave"  (Steve Cash, John Dillon) – 4:12
"It'll Shine When It Shines"  (Steve Cash, John Dillon) – 3:38

Charts

Personnel
Steve Cash - harmonica, percussion, vocals
John Dillon - guitar, dulcimer, harp, keyboards, vocals
Larry Lee - guitar, keyboards, drums, vocals
Randle Chowning - guitar, dobro, mandolin, harmonica, vocals
Michael Granda - bass, guitar, vocals
Buddy Brayfield - keyboards, vocals
Glyn Johns - guitar
Nick DeCaro - accordion
Jody Troutman - background vocals

Production
Producer: Glyn Johns/David Anderle
Recording Engineer: Glyn Johns
Art Direction: Roland Young
Photography: Harry Mittman, Jim Mayfield 
Liner notes: Ken Seeholzer

References

The Ozark Mountain Daredevils albums
1974 albums
Albums produced by Glyn Johns
Albums produced by David Anderle
A&M Records albums